The 1955 Milwaukee Braves season was the third in Milwaukee and the 85th overall season of the franchise.

Offseason 
 March 4, 1955: Catfish Metkovich was released by the Braves.
 Prior to 1955 season: (exact date unknown)
Marshall Bridges was acquired by the Braves from the New York Giants.
Chi-Chi Olivo was signed as an amateur free agent by the Braves.

Regular season

Season standings

Record vs. opponents

Notable transactions 
 June 3, 1955: Pete Whisenant was traded by the Braves to the St. Louis Cardinals for Del Rice.

Roster

Player stats

Batting

Starters by position 
Note: Pos = Position; G = Games played; AB = At bats; H = Hits; Avg. = Batting average; HR = Home runs; RBI = Runs batted in

Other batters 
Note: G = Games played; AB = At bats; H = Hits; Avg. = Batting average; HR = Home runs; RBI = Runs batted in

Pitching

Starting pitchers 
Note: G = Games pitched; IP = Innings pitched; W = Wins; L = Losses; ERA = Earned run average; SO = Strikeouts

Other pitchers 
Note: G = Games pitched; IP = Innings pitched; W = Wins; L = Losses; ERA = Earned run average; SO = Strikeouts

Relief pitchers 
Note: G = Games pitched; W = Wins; L = Losses; SV = Saves; ERA = Earned run average; SO = Strikeouts

Awards and honors 

All-Star Game
Del Crandall, catcher, starter
Eddie Mathews, third base, starter
Hank Aaron, reserve
Gene Conley, reserve
Johnny Logan, reserve

Farm system 

LEAGUE CHAMPIONS: Corpus Christi, Quebec, Lawton

Notes

References 

1955 Milwaukee Braves season at Baseball Reference

Milwaukee Braves seasons
Milwaukee Braves season
Milwau